Mansuriyeh or Mansuryeh or Mansouria may refer to places in:

Algeria
Ziama Mansouriah District

Iran
 Mansuriyeh, Fars
 Mansuriyeh, Isfahan
 Mansuriyeh, Khuzestan
 Mansuriyeh-ye Yek, Khuzestan Province
 Mansuriyeh-ye Do, Khuzestan Province
 Mansuriyeh-ye Seh, Khuzestan Province
 Mansuriyeh-ye Sadat, Khuzestan Province
 Mansuriyeh, Nishapur, Razavi Khorasan Province
 Mansuriyeh, Torbat-e Jam, Razavi Khorasan Province
 Mansuriyeh, South Khorasan

Iraq
El Mansouria, Iraq

Kuwait
 Mansouria, Kuwait

Lebanon
 El Mansouria, Lebanon

Morocco
 El Mansouria, Morocco

Tunisia
 Mansouria, Tunisia

Yemen
 El Mansouria, Yemen

See also
Mansoura (disambiguation)